This page provides supplementary chemical data on n-butane.

Material Safety Data Sheet  

The handling of this chemical may incur notable safety precautions. It is highly recommend that you seek the Material Safety Datasheet (MSDS) for this chemical from a reliable source such as eChemPortal, and follow its directions.

Structure and properties

Thermodynamic properties

Vapor pressure of liquid

n-Butane: Table data obtained from CRC Handbook of Chemistry and Physics 44th ed.

Spectral data

References

Chemical data pages
Data page
Chemical data pages cleanup